Ramiz Larbi Zerrouki (born 26 May 1998) is a professional footballer who plays as a midfielder for Eredivisie club FC Twente. Born in the Netherlands, he plays for the Algeria national team.

International career
Zerrouki was born in the Netherlands and is of Algerian descent. He had his debut with the Algeria national team in a 3–3 2021 Africa Cup of Nations qualification tie with Zambia on 25 March 2021.
He scored his first goal with the Algerian Flag on the 2nd of September 2021 against Djibouti scoring the 8th goal of the game.

He was included in Algeria's squad for the 2021 Africa Cup of Nations.

References

External links

NFT Profile
 Career stats & Profile - Voetbal International

1998 births
Living people
Footballers from Amsterdam
Algerian footballers
Algeria international footballers
Dutch footballers
Dutch people of Algerian descent
Association football midfielders
FC Twente players
Eredivisie players
2021 Africa Cup of Nations players